The 1976 Labour Party deputy leadership election occurred when Edward Short stood down from the deputy leadership of the Labour Party. It was won by Michael Foot who had stood unsuccessfully for the position three times before, and had come second to James Callaghan in the leadership election the previous April.

Candidates
 Michael Foot, Leader of the House of Commons, Member of Parliament for Ebbw Vale
 Shirley Williams, Secretary of State for Education and Science, Member of Parliament for Hertford and Stevenage

Results

Sources
 http://privatewww.essex.ac.uk/~tquinn/labour_party_deputy.htm 

1976
Labour Party deputy leadership
Labour Party deputy leadership election